Edwin Maxwell may refer to:

 Edwin Maxwell (actor) (1886–1948), Irish character actor
 Edwin Maxwell (attorney general) (1825–1903), American lawyer, judge, and politician
 Edwin A. Maxwell (1907–1987), Scottish mathematician

See also 
 Maxwell Fry (Edwin Maxwell Fry, 1899–1987), English modernist architect